Justin Hobgood (born July 31, 1979) is an American stock car racing driver in the NASCAR Nationwide Series and Camping World Truck Series. Hobgood drove the No. 91 Chevy Monte Carlo  part-time for MSRP Motorsports, a start and park team in the Nationwide series. His career best finish (27th) came in his first start in the 2003 Sam's Town 250 on October 18. He has made a handful of starts in 2003, 2008 and 2009 in the Nationwide Series. He also has a few truck starts;  his best finish and first ever NASCAR top-10 came at Talladega Superspeedway in the fall where he ended up 9th in a wild race.

Motorsports career results

NASCAR
(key) (Bold – Pole position awarded by qualifying time. Italics – Pole position earned by points standings or practice time. * – Most laps led.)

Nationwide Series

Camping World Truck Series

ARCA Re/Max Series
(key) (Bold – Pole position awarded by qualifying time. Italics – Pole position earned by points standings or practice time. * – Most laps led.)

External links
 Yahoo Driver Page
 

1979 births
Living people
NASCAR drivers
People from Winnsboro, South Carolina
Racing drivers from South Carolina
ARCA Menards Series drivers